The John Goodwin Tower Center for Political Studies' is an American think tank based in Dallas, Texas, and now associated with Southern Methodist University.  The primary mission of the Tower Center is to promote the study of politics and international affairs and to stimulate an interest in ethical public service among undergraduates. The Tower Center is an academic center where all parties and views are heard in a marketplace of ideas, and the Center pursues its mission in a non partisan manner.

Medal of Freedom
The Medal of Freedom is the highest honor the Tower Center bestows. It is awarded in recognition of extraordinary contributions to the advancement of democratic ideals and to the security, prosperity and welfare of humanity. Recipients include:
 Former Secretary of State and Chairman of the Joint Chiefs, General Colin Powell  (1997)
 Former Prime Minister of Great Britain, Lady Margaret Thatcher  (1999)
 The 41st President of the United States, George H. W. Bush  (2001)
 General Tommy Franks  (2003)
 Senator John McCain  (2006)
 Prime Minister Tony Blair  (2008)
 The 43rd President of the United States, George W. Bush and the Former First Lady Laura Bush  (2010)
 Former Secretary of State and Secretary of the Treasury, James A. Baker (2012)

Board of directors
 Dan Branch, Chair
 Robert W. Jordan, Vice-chair
 Hugh C. Akin
 Hunter L. Hunt
 Jan Hart Black
 Jan Rees-Jones
 Frederick Bush
 Gene Jones
 Felix Chen
 Brad E. Cheves, ex officio
 Cary M. Maguire
 Richard Collins
 Nancy Cain Marcus
 Penny Tower Cook
 Fred Meyer
 Brad O’Leary
 Jeanne Tower Cox
 Pat Patterson
 Thomas M. Dunning
 Rena Pederson
 Robert A. Estrada
 Sarah Perot
 Alan Feld
 Jeanne L. Phillips
 Richard W. Fisher
 Joe H. Staley, Jr.
 Darab Ganji
 William M. Tsutsui, ex officio
 Jerome Garza
 Jack C. Vaughn
 Linda Gibbons
 Roger Wallace
 Joseph M. Grant
 Ray Washburne
 Nancy Halbreich
 Jane Wetzel
 Karen Hughes
 Charles Wyly
 James F. Hollifield, ex officio

Honorary Board of Directors
 Howard Baker
 William L. Ball III
 George W. Bush
 William Cohen
 J. French Hill
 Kay Bailey Hutchison
 Samuel R. Johnson
 Tom Loeffler
 John McCain
 Frederick D. McClure
 Dr. Nicholas Rostow
 Carole Keeton Strayhorn

References

Political science organizations